The 2013 Dutch Open Grand Prix was the thirtieth grand prix gold and grand prix tournament of the 2013 BWF Grand Prix Gold and Grand Prix. The tournament was held in Topsportcentrum, Almere, Netherlands October 8 until October 13, 2013 and had a total purse of $50,000.

Men's singles

Seeds

  Eric Pang (first round)
  Tan Chun Seang (third round)
  Mohd Arif Abdul Latif (withdrew)
  Ville Lang (withdrew)
  Henri Hurskainen (third round)
  Derek Wong Zi Liang (quarter-final)
  Dmytro Zavadsky (semi-final)
  Chan Yan Kit (final)
  Petr Koukal (withdrew)
  Zulfadli Zulkiffli (second round)
  Wisnu Yuli Prasetyo (third round)
  Riyanto Subagja (third round)
  Matthieu Lo Ying Ping (withdrew)
  Yuhan Tan (second round)
  Arvind Bhat (quarter-final)
  Kieran Merrilees (quarter-final)

Finals

Top half

Section 1

Section 2

Section 3

Section 4

Bottom half

Section 5

Section 6

Section 7

Section 8

Women's singles

Seeds

  Porntip Buranaprasertsuk (quarter-final)
  Busanan Ongbumrungpan (champion)
  Gu Juan (final)
  Petya Nedelcheva (first round)
  Deng Xuan (second round)
  Sashina Vignes Waran (first round)
  Kristina Gavnholt (quarter-final)
  Karin Schnaase (quarter-final)

Finals

Top half

Section 1

Section 2

Bottom half

Section 3

Section 4

Men's doubles

Seeds

  Mohd Zakry Abdul Latif / Mohd Fairuzizuan Mohd Tazari (withdrew)
  Ruud Bosch / Koen Ridder (quarter-final)
  Pranav Chopra / Akshay Dewalkar (second round)
  Wahyu Nayaka / Ade Yusuf (champion)

Finals

Top half

Section 1

Section 2

Bottom half

Section 3

Section 4

Women's doubles

Seeds

  Shinta Mulia Sari / Yao Lei (second round)
  Gabriela Stoeva / Stefani Stoeva (second round)
  Irina Khlebko / Ksenia Polikarpova (quarter-final)
  Imogen Bankier /  Petya Nedelcheva (quarter-final)

Finals

Top half

Section 1

Section 2

Bottom half

Section 3

Section 4

Mixed doubles

Seeds

  Muhammad Rijal / Debby Susanto (final)
  Danny Bawa Chrisnanta / Vanessa Neo Yu Yan (champion)
  Jorrit de Ruiter / Samantha Barning (withdrew)
  Irfan Fadhilah / Weni Anggraini (quarter-final)
  Robert Blair / Imogen Bankier (withdrew)
  Lukhi Apri Nugroho / Annisa Saufika (second round)
  Edi Subaktiar / Gloria Emanuelle Widjaja (withdrew)
  Nico Ruponen / Amanda Hogstrom (quarter-final)

Finals

Top half

Section 1

Section 2

Bottom half

Section 3

Section 4

References

2013 in Dutch sport
Dutch Open Grand Prix
Dutch Open (badminton)
Sports competitions in Almere